Michael Berrer was the defending champion, but lost in the quarterfinal to Peter Gojowczyk.

Gojowczyk won the title, defeating Igor Sijsling in the final, 6–4, 7–5.

Seeds

Draw

Finals

Top half

Bottom half

References

 Main Draw
 Qualifying Draw

Intersport Heilbronn Open - Singles
2014 Singles